The Tulane Environmental Law Journal (TELJ) is a legal periodical produced and edited by students at the Tulane University Law School.  The journal has been recognized as among the top fifteen environmental law journals.  Articles are written by professors, practitioners, and Tulane Law students.  It was founded in 1988.  Oliver Houck serves as the Journal's faculty adviser.

Distinguished alumni
Mona M. Stone, JD 1997, Chicago partner of Locke Lord Bissell & Liddell; former Business Editor of the Journal
Trilby Robinson–Dorn, JD 1997, Seattle partner of K&L Gates; former Editor in Chief of the Journal

See also
Tulane Environmental Law Clinic

References

American law journals
Tulane University Law School
Biannual journals
Publications established in 1988
Environmental law journals
Law journals edited by students